Trent Nichols (born 7 April 1969) is a former Australian rules footballer who played for Richmond, West Coast and North Melbourne in the Australian Football League.

Nichols was picked up by Richmond with pick 17 in the 1986 VFL Draft but didn't debut until the 1988 season. In the 1990 Brownlow Medal count he finished with the most votes by a Richmond player. He crossed to West Coast in 1992 but struggled to find a place in the side, managing just 4 games during his stint in Perth. North Melbourne signed him for the 1994 season but by 1996 was playing in the reserves, winning that year's Gardiner Medal. He played in three consecutive reserves premierships: with North Melbourne in 1995 and 1996, then with Richmond in 1997.

References

External links

1969 births
Living people
West Coast Eagles players
Richmond Football Club players
North Melbourne Football Club players
Sandy Bay Football Club players
Tasmanian State of Origin players
Australian rules footballers from Tasmania
Tasmanian Football Hall of Fame inductees
Allies State of Origin players
Clarence Football Club players
East Fremantle Football Club players